Glens Falls Home for Aged Women is a historic residential building located at Glens Falls, Warren County, New York.  It was built in 1903 and is a large, "T" shaped, -story brick institutional building topped by a gambrel roof in the Colonial Revival style.  It features a central entrance pavilion with a gambrel-roofed cross gable and a semi-circular entrance portico.

It was added to the National Register of Historic Places in 1984.

In 2004, Rocco Andrew Musumeci, Sr. purchased the home for his family as a summer home.  After a decade of personal use, the Glens Falls Home For Aged Women has inadvertently become a local home of acceptance and refuge for disadvantaged and disabled persons.  Rocco Musumeci and his family continue to care for the local community and for the Home’s guests by their own good will and generosity.

See also
 National Register of Historic Places listings in Warren County, New York

References

Residential buildings on the National Register of Historic Places in New York (state)
Colonial Revival architecture in New York (state)
Residential buildings completed in 1903
Buildings and structures in Warren County, New York
National Register of Historic Places in Warren County, New York